Newfoundland Scene: A Tale of Outport Adventure is a Canadian documentary film, directed by F. R. Crawley and released in 1951. 

The film, which was sponsored by Imperial Oil, was shot in 1949 to mark the admission of Newfoundland to Canadian Confederation and depicted various scenes of life throughout Canada's newest province. It highlights Newfoundland's natural resources, with a focus on cod fishing, seal hunting, and whaling. Also looked at is transportation by dog sled; included is a scene where a team of Malemutes rebels against its leader, causing injury. 

It won the Canadian Film Award for Film of the Year at the 1952 Canadian Film Awards. It was reissued in the 1970s, with rerecorded narration by Gordon Pinsent and some potentially controversial hunting scenes removed.

References

External links
 

1951 short films
1951 documentary films
Canadian short documentary films
Best Picture Genie and Canadian Screen Award winners
Canadian black-and-white films
1950s English-language films
1950s Canadian films
1950s short documentary films